Lennard's Carrying Co Ltd v Asiatic Petroleum Co Ltd [1915] AC 705 is a famous decision by the House of Lords on the ability to impose liability upon a corporation. The decision expands upon the earlier decision in Salomon v Salomon & Co. [1897] AC 22 and first introduced the "alter ego" theory of corporate liability.

Facts
A ship owned by Lennard's Carrying Co was transporting some goods on a voyage from Novorossiysk to the Asiatic Petroleum Company, a joint venture of the Shell and Royal Dutch oil companies. The ship sank and the cargo was lost. The judge found that the director, Mr Lennard, did know or should have known about defects in the ship, which led its boiler to catch fire, and ultimately sink the ship. There was an exemption from liability in section 502 of the Merchant Shipping Act 1894, stating that a ship owner would not be liable for losses if an event happened without 'actual fault or privity'. Asiatic Petroleum Co Ltd sued Mr Lennard's company for negligence under the Act. At issue was whether the guilty acts of a director would be imposed upon the corporation. Lennard's Carrying Co Ltd argued that it was not liable and could be exempt under section 502.

Judgment
The House of Lords held that liability could be imposed on a corporation for the acts of the directors because there is a rebuttable presumption the directors are the controlling minds of the company. Here Mr Lennard did not rebut the presumption. Viscount Haldane explained the "directing mind" principle of corporate liability:

In considering the case of Mr Lennard himself he stated:

Significance
Prior to this case the primary means of imposing liability on a corporation was through vicarious liability, but that applied only to employees of the company, which excluded the directors. After the Lennard case, the alter ego theory has become the most powerful method of imposing liability on a corporation. It has proved to be particularly effective for imposing criminal liability.

References

External links
Full case text

1915 in case law
House of Lords cases
United Kingdom company case law
1915 in British law
Shell plc